The Politics of Oman  take place in a framework of an absolute monarchy, where the Sultan of Oman is both head of state and head of government. The Sultan is hereditary, who appoints a cabinet to assist him. The sultan also serves as the supreme commander of the armed forces and prime minister.

Monarchy 

The Sultan is a direct descendant of Sayyid Sa'id bin Sultan, who first opened relations with the United States in 1833. The Sultanate has neither political parties nor legislature, although the bicameral representative bodies provide the government with advice.  The present Sultan has no direct heir, and has not publicly designated a successor.  Instead, the ruling family should unanimously designate a new Sultan after his death.  If they do not designate a new ruler after three days, then they open a letter left to them by the deceased Sultan, containing a recommendation for a new Sultan. 

The current sultan is Haitham bin Tariq, who was appointed on 11 January 2020 following the death of his cousin Sultan Qaboos bin Said al-Saidd.

Judicial system
The court system in Oman is regulated by Royal Decree 90/99. There are three court levels in Oman, the Elementary Court is the lowest court, followed by the Court of Appeal, and then the Supreme Court as the highest court in the country.

Administrative divisions
Administratively, the populated regions are divided into 63 districts (wilayats), presided over by governors (walis) responsible for settling local disputes, collecting taxes, and maintaining peace.

The Consultative Council
In November 1991, Sultan Qaboos replaced the 10-year-old State Consultative Council with the Consultative Assembly (Majlis al-Shura) to systematize and broaden public participation in government. The Assembly has 84 elected members and exercises some legislative powers. Representatives were chosen in the following manner: Local caucuses in each of the 59 districts sent forward three nominees' names, whose credentials were reviewed by a cabinet committee. These names were then forwarded to the Sultan, who made the final selection. The Consultative Assembly serves as a conduit of information between the people and the government ministries. It is empowered to review drafts of economic and social legislation prepared by service ministries, such as communications and housing, and provide recommendations. Service ministers also may be summoned before the Majlis to respond to representatives' questions. It has no authority in the areas of foreign affairs, defense, security, and finances.
The Council of State (Majlis al-Dawla) has 83 appointed members including 14 women.

Political parties and elections
Oman does not allow political parties and only holds elections with expanding suffrage for a consultative assembly.
The previously influential opposition movement, the Popular Front for the Liberation of Oman, is dormant today. The last elections were held on 27 October 2019.

International organization participation
Oman participates in ABEDA, AFESD, AL, AMF, ESCWA, FAO, G-77, GCC, IAEA, IBRD, ICAO, IDA, IDB, IFAD, IFC, IHO, ILO, IMF, IMO, Inmarsat, Intelsat, Interpol, IOC, ISO (correspondent), ITU, NAM, OIC, OPCW, United Nations, UNCTAD, UNESCO, UNIDO, UPU, WFTU, WHO, WIPO, WMO, WTrO.

Notes and references

External links
Oman Ministry of Information
Omani Ministry of Foreign Affairs

 
Oman